Rutherfurd is a lunar impact crater located entirely within the southern rim of the much larger crater Clavius. The crater Porter is located to the north-northeast of Rutherfurd, on the northeastern rim of Clavius. Rutherfurd forms the larger member in an arcing chain of craters of decreasing size that curves across the floor of Clavius. The craters in this chain do not appear to be the same age, so this formation is most likely random in nature.

Rutherfurd is somewhat oval in shape, with the long axis oriented approximately in a north–south direction. The northern outer ramparts have a series of radiating ridges on the floor of Clavius. The rim overlies the inner wall of Clavius, and thus the rim of Rutherfurd is higher above the surface along the north and west sides. The floor is irregular in shape, and there is a central peak somewhat offset to the northeast. The ejecta pattern, oblong shape, and location of the central peak indicate the original impact may have been at a low angle from the southeast.  Due to its rays, Rutherfurd is mapped as part of the Copernican System.

The crater was named by and for astrophotographer Lewis Morris Rutherfurd who took the first telescopic photographs of the moon.

Satellite craters
By convention these features are identified on lunar maps by placing the letter on the side of the crater midpoint that is closest to Rutherfurd.

References

 
 
 
 
 
 
 
 
 
 
 
 

Impact craters on the Moon
Rutherfurd family